The 2019 Curlers Corner Autumn Gold Curling Classic was held from October 11 to 14 at the Calgary Curling Club in Calgary, Alberta as part of the World Curling Tour. The event was held in a triple-knockout format with a purse of $44,000.

In the final, Kerri Einarson of Gimli defeated Cheryl Bernard who was skipping Team Scheidegger 7–0 to claim the title.

Teams
The teams are listed as follows:

Knockout brackets

Source:

A event

B event

C event

Knockout results
All draw times listed in Mountain Daylight Time.

Draw 1
Friday, October 11, 9:30 am

Draw 2
Friday, October 11, 1:15 pm

Draw 3
Friday, October 11, 5:15 pm

Draw 4
Friday, October 11, 9:00 pm

Draw 5
Saturday, October 12, 9:00 am

Draw 6
Saturday, October 12, 12:45 pm

Draw 7
Saturday, October 12, 4:30 pm

Draw 8
Saturday, October 12, 8:15 pm

Draw 9
Sunday, October 13, 9:00 am

Draw 10
Sunday, October 13, 12:45 pm

Draw 11
Sunday, October 13, 4:30 pm

Draw 12
Sunday, October 13, 8:15 pm

Playoffs

Source:

Quarterfinals 
Monday, October 14, 9:00 am

Semifinals 
Monday, October 14, 12:15 pm

Final 
Monday, October 14, 3:30 pm

References

External links
CurlingZone

Autumn Gold Curling Classic
2019 in Canadian curling
2019 in Alberta
October 2019 sports events in Canada
2019 in women's curling
2010s in Calgary